Armak (also known as Armagh, Armakī, and Armaq) is a village in Moghuyeh Rural District, in the Central District of Bandar Lengeh County, Hormozgan Province, Iran. At the 2006 census, its population was 679, in 128 families.

References 

Populated places in Bandar Lengeh County